= Judo at the 2010 South American Games – Men's 55kg =

Judo competition

The Men's 55 kg event at the 2010 South American Games was held on March 21.

== Medalists ==
Gold	Silver	Bronze
Armando Maita; Venezuela	Cristhian Gabriel Vera; Ecuador	Andres Alezander Muñoz; Colombia; Juan Pablo Vital; Argentina

== Results ==
=== Main Bracket ===
Quarterfinals
Armando Maita (VEN)	020^{1}
Adolfo Alvarez (CHI)	000^{1}
John Arcentales (PER)	000
Juan Pablo Vital (ARG)	101

Semifinals
Armando Maita (VEN)	012
Andres Alezander Muñoz (COL)	010^{3}
Juan Pablo Vital (ARG)	001^{2}
Cristhian Gabriel Vera (ECU)	003^{2}

Final
Armando Maita (VEN)	100
Cristhian Gabriel Vera (ECU)	000

=== Repechage ===
Round 1
Adolfo Alvarez (CHI)
bye
John Arcentales (PER)
bye

Round 2
Adolfo Alvarez (CHI)	000^{1}
Juan Pablo Vital (ARG)	100^{1}
John Arcentales (PER)	000
Andres Alezander Muñoz (COL)	100
